Arvis Gjata (born 23 June 1987) is an Albanian footballer who currently plays as a midfielder for Dinamo Tirana in the Albanian First Division.

Career

KF Tirana
He signed for KF Tirana along with fellow Shkumbini Peqin player Xhino Sejdo on 26 January 2012, on an 18-month contract worth 100,000 lek a month (around €715 at the time).

Career stats

References

External links

1987 births
Living people
People from Peqin
Association football midfielders
Albanian footballers
KS Shkumbini Peqin players
KF Skënderbeu Korçë players
KF Tirana players
FK Tomori Berat players
FK Dinamo Tirana players
Kategoria Superiore players